Qarah Shiran (also Romanized as Qarah Shīrān and Qareh Shīrān; also known as Karashinar and Qara Chenār) is a village in Yurchi-ye Gharbi Rural District of Kuraim District, Nir County, Ardabil province, Iran. At the 2006 census, its population was 720 in 176 households. The following census in 2011 counted 617 people in 193 households. The latest census in 2016 showed a population of 491 people in 159 households; it was the largest village in its rural district.

References 

Nir County

Towns and villages in Nir County

Populated places in Ardabil Province

Populated places in Nir County